Donald Payne may refer to:
Donald G. Payne (1924–2018), English author
Donald M. Payne (1934–2012), former U.S. Representative from New Jersey, father of Donald Payne, Jr.
Donald Payne Jr. (born 1958), current U.S. Representative from New Jersey, son of Donald M. Payne
Donald Payne (British Army soldier) (born 1970), British soldier who became his country's first convicted war criminal during his tour in Iraq
Don Payne (writer) (1964–2013), American writer and producer
Don Payne (musician) (1933–2017), American jazz bassist
Donald Payne (American football) (born 1994), American football player